Hlaing can refer to several features in Burma (Myanmar):
Hlaing Township, Yangon Region
Yangon River (Rangoon River)
Hlaing, Kayin, a village in Kyain Seikgyi Township, Kayin State
Hlaing, a village in Mon State  
Hlaing, a village in Mon State 
...or to:
 Min Aung Hlaing, Myanmar military and political leader